The 1910 Open Championship was the 50th Open Championship, held 21–24 June at the Old Course at St Andrews, Fife, Scotland. James Braid won the championship for the fifth time, four strokes ahead of Sandy Herd, the 1902 champion.

There was no qualifying competition; all 210 entries played 18 holes in pairs on the first two days with the top sixty and ties advancing for the final 36 holes on the third day. Prize money was increased by £10 with the addition of £5 prizes for seventh and eighth places.

Play started on Tuesday, 21 June, but an early afternoon thunderstorm flooded many of the greens and play was cancelled. It was decided that all existing scores would not count and that the Championship would start again on Wednesday and extend to Friday.

After the first round, George Duncan led with 73, a stroke ahead of Willie Watt and Robert Thomson. The leaderboard changed significantly during the second round on Thursday with Duncan shooting 77, while Watt and Thomson took 82 and 85. The midway leader was Willie Smith, then a professional in Mexico City, who shot 71 for 148. Braid was a stroke back on 149 with Duncan third on 150. The cut was at 161 or better and 64 players advanced for the final day.

Duncan's 71 on Friday morning gave him the 54-hole lead, two strokes ahead of Braid with Herd and Ted Ray a further four shots behind. Duncan's 83 in the afternoon dropped him to third place and gave Braid a comfortable victory with Herd second. Smith's second 80 of the day left him in a disappointing tie for fifth place.

Past champions in the field 

Source:

Did not enter: Jack White (1904), 
Harold Hilton (1892, 1897)

Round summaries

First round
Tuesday, 21 June 1910 
Wednesday, 22 June 1910

A thunderstorm on Tuesday afternoon caused flooding; all scores for the day were thrown out and play was restarted on Wednesday.

Source:

Second round
Thursday, 23 June 1910

Source:

Third round
Friday, 24 June 1910 (morning)

Source:

Final round
Friday, 24 June 1910 (afternoon)

Source:

References

External links
St Andrews 1910 (Official site)

The Open Championship
Golf tournaments in Scotland
Open Championship
Open Championship
Open Championship